The Miss Ecuador 1982, Jacqueline Burgos from Guayas, was crowned on May 4, 1982 through a casting that was held in Telecentro. She was crowned by Lucía Urjelles from Guayas, Miss Ecuador 1981. She competed at Miss Universe 1982, but she did no place. Also, Gianna Machiavello from Guayas was selected to compete at Miss World 1982.

Result

External links

Miss Ecuador